Naicam Airport  is located adjacent to Naicam, Saskatchewan, Canada.

See also 
 List of airports in Saskatchewan
 List of defunct airports in Canada

References 

Defunct airports in Saskatchewan
Pleasantdale No. 398, Saskatchewan